Indian art evolved with an emphasis on inducing special spiritual or philosophical states in the audience, or with representing them symbolically.

Rasas in the performing arts 

The theory of rasas still forms the aesthetic underpinning of all Indian classical dance and theatre, such as Bharatanatyam, kathak, Kuchipudi, Odissi, Manipuri, Kudiyattam, Kathakali and others. Expressing Rasa in classical Indian dance form is referred to as Rasa-abhinaya. The Nātyasāstra carefully delineates the bhavas used to create each rasa.

The expressions used in Kudiyattam or Kathakali are extremely exaggerated theatrical expressions. The opposite of this interpretation is Balasaraswathi's school of subtle and understated abhinaya of the devadasis. There were serious public debates when Balasaraswathi condemned Rukmini Devi's puritanistic interpretations and applications of Sringara rasa. The abhinaya of the Melattur style of abhinaya remains extremely rich in variations of the emotions, while the Pandanallur style expressions are more limited in scope.

History

Natyashastra

Rasa theory blossoms beginning with the Sanskrit text Nātyashāstra (nātya meaning "drama" and shāstra meaning "science of"), a work attributed to Bharata Muni where the Gods declare that drama is the 'Fifth Veda' because it is suitable for the degenerate age as the best form of religious instruction. The Nātyashāstra presents the aesthetic concepts of rasas and their associated bhāvas in Chapters Six and Seven respectively, which appear to be independent of the work as a whole.  Eight rasas and associated bhāvas are named and their enjoyment is likened to savoring a meal: rasa is the enjoyment of flavors that arise from the proper preparation of ingredients and the quality of ingredients.

Kashmiri aestheticians
The theory of the rasas develops significantly with the Kashmiri aesthetician Ãndandavardhana's classic on poetics, the Dhvanyāloka which introduces the ninth rasa, shānta-rasa as a specifically religious feeling of peace (śānta) which arises from its bhāva, weariness of the pleasures of the world.  The primary purpose of this text is to refine the literary concept dhvani or poetic suggestion, by arguing for the existence of rasa-dhvani, primarily in forms of Sanskrit including a word, sentence or whole work "suggests" a real-world emotional state or bhāva, but thanks to aesthetic distance, the sensitive spectator relishes the rasa, the aesthetic flavor of tragedy, heroism or romance.

The 9th - 10th century master of the religious system known as "the nondual Shaivism of Kashmir" (or Kashmir Shaivism) and aesthetician, Abhinavagupta brought rasa theory to its pinnacle in his separate commentaries on the Dhvanyāloka, the Dhvanyāloka-locana (translated by Ingalls, Masson and Patwardhan, 1992) and the Abhinavabharati, his commentary on the Nātyashāstra, portions of which are translated by Gnoli and Masson and Patwardhan.  Abhinavagupta offers for the first time a technical definition of rasa which is the universal bliss of the Self or Atman colored by the emotional tone of a drama.

Inclusion of bhakti
In the literary compositions, the emotion of Bhakti as a feeling of adoration towards God was long considered only a minor feeling fit only for Stothras, but not capable of being developed into a separate rasa as the sole theme of a whole poem or drama. In the tenth century, it was still struggling, and Aacharya Abhinavagupta mentions Bhakti in his commentary on the Natya Shastra, as an important accessory sentiment of the Shanta Rasa, which he strove with great effort to establish. However, just as Shantha slowly attained a state of primacy that it was considered the Rasa of Rasas, Bhakti also soon began to loom large and despite the lukewarmness of the great run of Alankarikas, had the service of some distinguished advocates, including Tyagaraja. It is the Bhagavata that gave the great impetus to the study of Bhakti from an increasingly aesthetic point of view.

Attention to rasas
Poets like Kālidāsa were attentive to rasa, which blossomed into a fully developed aesthetic system.  Even in contemporary India the term rasa denoting "flavor" or "essence" is used colloquially to describe the aesthetic experiences in films.

The navarasas

Bharata Muni enunciated the eight Rasas in the Nātyasāstra, an ancient Sanskrit text of dramatic theory and other performance arts, written between 200 BC and 200 AD. In the Indian performing arts, a rasa is a sentiment or emotion evoked in each member of the audience by the art. The Natya Shastra mentions six rasa in one section, but in the dedicated section on rasa it states and discusses eight primary rasa. Each rasa, according to Nātyasāstra, has a presiding deity and a specific colour. There are 4 pairs of rasas. For instance, Hāsya arises out of Sringara. The Aura of a frightened person is black, and the aura of an angry person is red. Bharata Muni established the following:

 (शृङ्गारः):  Romance, Love, attractiveness. Presiding deity: Vishnu. Colour: light green
 (हास्यं):  Laughter, mirth, comedy. Presiding deity: Shiva. Colour: white
 (रौद्रं): Fury. Presiding deity: Shiva. Colour: red
 (कारुण्यं): Compassion, mercy. Presiding deity: Yama. Colour: grey
 (बीभत्सं): Disgust, aversion. Presiding deity: Shiva. Colour: blue
 (भयानकं): Horror, terror. Presiding deity: Yama. Colour: black
 (वीरं): Heroism. Presiding deity: Indra. Colour: saffron
 (अद्भुतं): Wonder, amazement. Presiding deity: Brahma. Colour: yellow

Śāntam rasa
A ninth rasa was added by later authors. This addition had to undergo a good deal of struggle between the sixth and the tenth centuries, before it could be accepted by the majority of the Alankarikas, and the expression "Navarasa" (the nine rasas), could come into vogue.

: Peace or tranquility. deity: Vishnu. Colour: perpetual white.

Shānta-rasa functions as an equal member of the set of rasas, but it is simultaneously distinct as being the most clear form of aesthetic bliss.  Abhinavagupta likens it to the string of a jeweled necklace; while it may not be the most appealing for most people, it is the string that gives form to the necklace, allowing the jewels of the other eight rasas to be relished.  Relishing the rasas and particularly shānta-rasa is hinted as being as-good-as but never-equal-to the bliss of Self-realization experienced by yogis.

See also

 Abhinaya
 Bishōnen – A Japanese beauty concept with influence from Indian aesthetic concepts
 Nātyasāstra – An ancient Sanskrit text on performance arts and aesthetics
 Nātyakalpadrumam
 Rasa lila
 Sanskrit Literature
 Sanskrit Theatre

Further reading
 Sen, R. K., Aesthetic Enjoyment: Its Background in Philosophy and Medicine, Calcutta: University of Calcutta, 1966
 Sen, R. K., A Brief Introduction to a Comparative Study of Greek and Indian Aesthetics and Poetics, Calcutta: Sen Ray & Co., 1954
 Sen, R. K., Nature of Aesthetic Enjoyment in Greek and Indian Analyses, Indian Aesthetics and Art Activity, Simla: Indian Institute of Advanced Study, 1968
 Sukla, Ananta Charan, The Concept of Imitation in Greek and Indian Aesthetics, Calcutta: Rupa & Co., 1977
 Sukla, Ananta Charan, Understanding and Enjoyment in Aesthetic Experience, Journal of Comparative Literature and Aesthetics: 1978
 Sukla, Ananta Charan, Contemporary Indian Aesthetics, Milan (Italy): Rubberttino, 1995
 Sukla, Ananta Charan, Representation in Painting and Drama: Arguments from Indian Aesthetics, Journal of Comparative Literature and Aesthetics: 1992
 Sukla, Ananta Charan, Aesthetics Beyond/ Within Aesthetics: The Scope and Limits of Indian Aesthetics, Journal of Comparative Literature and Aesthetics: 1995
 Sukla, Ananta Charan, Rasa, Sringara and Sringara Rasa: Aesthetics as Mass Culture in Indian Antiquity, Lahti (Finland): 1995
 Sukla, Ananta Charan, Art, Nature and the Artifactuality of Art and Nature: A Plea for Environmental Aesthetics in Ancient India, Journal of Comparative Literature and Aesthetics: 1996
 Sukla, Ananta Charan, Art, Reality and the Reality of the Arts: Ontology, Representation and The Sister Arts Theory in Indian Aesthetics, Indian Response to Literary Theory, Delhi: 1996
 Sukla, Ananta Charan, Emotion, Aesthetic Experience and the Contextualist Turn, International Yearbook of Aesthetics: 1996
 Sukla, Ananta Charan, Dhvani as a Pivot in Sanskrit Literary Aesthetics, East and West in Aesthetics, Siena (Italy): 1997
 Sukla, Ananta Charan, Transculturality of Classical Indian Aesthetics, Frontiers of Transculturality in Contemporary Aesthetics, Turin (Italy): 2001
Sukla, Ananta Charan, Contemporary Indian Aesthetics, Vishvanatha Kaviraja Institute (India): 1995
Matthew Jones (January 2010). "Bollywood, Rasa and Indian Cinema: Misconceptions, Meanings and Millionaire". Visual Anthropology 23 (1): 33–43.

References

External links
 Rasa (sentiments) and Bhāva (psychological states) - in the Natya-shastra

Dance in India
I
Literary theory
Indian philosophy